Lee Cronin is an Irish film writer and director. He is best known as the writer/director of the 2014 Méliès d'Argent award-winning short, Ghost Train, and the well-reviewed 2019 horror film The Hole in the Ground. He is also set to write and direct Evil Dead Rise, the next film in the Evil Dead series.

Filmography
Short films

Feature films

Television

References

External links

Horror film directors
Living people
Irish film directors
Irish screenwriters
People from County Dublin
Year of birth missing (living people)